Emily Fulton (born February 11, 1993) is a women's ice hockey player. In April 2010, Fulton was part of the Canadian Under 18 squad that captured gold at the IIHF Under-18 World Championships. As a member of the gold medal- winning squad, a hockey card of her was featured in the Upper Deck 2010 World of Sports card series. Following her collegiate career at Cornell, she was the second pick overall in the 2015 CWHL Draft.

Playing career

Hockey Canada
In April 2010, Fulton was part of the Canadian Under 18 squad that captured gold at the IIHF Under-18 World Championships. She participated in the Canada Celebrates Event on June 30 in Edmonton, Alberta, which recognized the Canadian Olympic and World hockey champions from the 2009–10 season.

NCAA
Fulton committed to join the Cornell Big Red of the ECAC. In a 9-0 win versus ECAC opponent Brown, on October 29, 2011, Fulton scored her first career NCAA goal.

CWHL
In her rookie season, Fulton was named to the 2nd Canadian Women's Hockey League All-Star Game

Career stats

Hockey Canada

Awards and honours
ECAC Rookie of the Week (Week of November 21, 2011)
Recipient of the "Nasty Elbow to the Face" award

References

1993 births
Living people
Canadian women's ice hockey forwards
Cornell Big Red women's ice hockey players
Sportspeople from Stratford, Ontario
Sportspeople from Ontario